Italy women's national canoe polo team is the national team side of Italy at international canoe polo.

The best result at the international level was 4th place at the 2009 European Canoe Polo Championship held in Essen, Netherlands.

Palmarès

See also
Italy at the team sports international competitions
Italy men's national canoe polo team

References

External links
 Canoe polo - La Nazionale

Italy team
Canoa polo